Philotheca freyciana, commonly known as the Freycinet waxflower, is a species of flowering plant in the family Rutaceae and is endemic to a small area of Tasmania. It is a small, erect shrub with intertwined, heart-shaped to egg-shaped leaves with the narrower end at the base, and white, five-petalled flowers arranged singly in leaf axils.

Description
Flowering occurs from April to May and from September to October.

Taxonomy and naming
Philotheca freyciana was first formally described in 2001 by Andrew Rozefelds in the journal  Muelleria from specimens collected on Mount Amos in Freycinet National Park.

Distribution and habitat
This species of philotheca grows in cracks on granite rocks in dry, open scrubland and is only known from The Hazards in Freycinet National Park.

Conservation status
This species is classified as "endangered" under the Australian Government Environment Protection and Biodiversity Conservation Act 1999 and the Tasmanian Government Threatened Species Protection Act 1995. The main threats to the species are drought stress, browsing by native animals, inappropriate fire regimes and illegal collection.

References

freyciana
Flora of Tasmania
Sapindales of Australia
Plants described in 2001
Taxa named by Andrew Carl Frank Rozefelds